The USGAA Senior Football Championship is a competition run by USGAA between Gaelic football teams from various cities in the United States. The 2017 finals were held in San Francisco.

Roll of Honor

References
USGAA website
Boston GAA website
Thar an Trasnan

Gaelic football competitions in the United States